Rondônia is one of the 26 states of Brazil, located in the northern subdivision of the country (central-western part). To the west is a short border with the state of Acre, to the north is the state of Amazonas, in the east is Mato Grosso, and in the south and southwest is Bolivia. Rondônia has a population of 1,815,000 as of 2021. It is the fifth least populated state. Its capital and largest city is Porto Velho. The state was named after Cândido Rondon, who explored the north of the country during the 1910s. The state, which is home to 0.8% of the Brazilian population, is responsible for 0.6% of the Brazilian GDP.

Geography

Rondonia was originally home to over 200,000 km2 of rainforest, but has become one of the most deforested places in the Amazon. By 2003 around 70,000 km2 of rainforest had been cleared.

The area around the Guaporé River is part of the Beni savanna ecoregion.

The Samuel Dam is located in the state, on the Jamari River.

History

Demographics
According to the IBGE of 2008, there were 1,519,000 people residing in the state. The population density was 6.6 inhabitants/km2.
Urbanization: 66.8% (2004); Population growth: 2.2% (1991-2000); Houses: 430,747 (2005).

The last PNAD (National Research for Sample of Domiciles) census revealed the following numbers:  832,000 Brown (Multiracial) people (54.81%), 546,000 White people (35.95%), 115,000 Black people (7.56%), 16,000 Asian people (1.08%), 8,000 Amerindian people (0.53%).

Indigenous peoples

 there were 21 Indigenous Territories in Rondônia, with two more in process of being demarcated. The largest of these, the Uru-Eu-Wau-Wau Indigenous Territory, covers over 1.8 million hectares. Another, the Rio Omerê Indigenous Territory, is home to the Kanoê and Akuntsu people. Both tribes were the victims of massacres by cattle ranchers in the 1970s and 1980s and currently number just four and five individuals respectively.

Over 20 indigenous languages are spoken in Rondônia. Below is a list of indigenous languages spoken in the state:

Economy

The economy of the state of Rondônia has, as main activities, agriculture, livestock, food industry and vegetal and mineral extraction. In 2016, the state's GDP reached R$ 39.451 billion. Its export basket is mainly composed of frozen beef (43.43%), soy (32.77%), raw tin (7.08%), sawn wood (2.36%) and edible giblets (2.02%).

Beginning in the 1970s, the state attracted farmers from the south-central part of the country, stimulated by the federal government's colonization projects and the availability of cheap and fertile land. The development of agricultural activities has transformed the area into one of the main agricultural frontiers in the country and one of the most prosperous and productive regions in northern Brazil. The state stands out in the production of coffee (largest producer in the North and 5th largest in Brazil), cocoa (2nd largest producer in the North and 3rd largest in Brazil), beans (2nd largest producer in the North), maize (2nd largest producer in the North region), soybean (3rd largest producer in the North region), rice (3rd largest producer in the North region) and cassava (4th largest producer in the North region). Despite the large volume of production and the small territory by the region's standards (7 times smaller than Amazonas and 6 times smaller than Pará), Rondônia still has more than 60% of its territory fully preserved.

In coffee production, Rondônia was, in 2019, the 5th largest producer in the country, being the 2nd largest producer of Coffea canephora, getting a total of 2.3 million bags of 60 kg of coffee (near 138 thousand tons) this year.

In soy, in the 2019 Brazilian harvest, Rondônia harvested 1.2 million tons, 3rd in the North Region.

In 2019, the state produced 805 thousand tons of maize, second largest production in the northern region, losing only to Tocantins.

In cassava production, Brazil produced a total of 17.6 million tons in 2018. Rondônia was the 11th largest producer in the country, with 583 thousand tons.

In 2018, Rondônia produced 124 thousand tons of rice.

In the production of cocoa, Pará has been competing with Bahia for the leadership of Brazilian production. In 2019, Pará harvested 135 thousand tons of cocoa, and Bahians harvested 130 thousand tons. Rondônia is the 3rd largest cocoa producer in the country, with 18 thousand tons harvested in 2017.

In 2017, the state had a cattle herd of 14,098,031 head of cattle (73,37% for beef and the rest for dairy), second largest herd in the North, second only to Pará, being the 6th largest in the country, 5th in meat exports and 8th in milk production. The state's milk production in 2018 was around 800 million liters, the largest producer in the North.

In 2017, Rondônia had 0.62% of the national mineral participation (8th place in the country). Rondônia had production of tin (10,9 thousand tons at a value of R$ 333 million), gold (1 ton at a value of R$ 125 million), niobium (in the form of columbita-tantalita) (3.5 thousand tons at R$ 24 million), and zinc in gross form (26 thousand tons at R$ 27 million) In addition, in gemstones, the state has some production of garnet.

In industry, Rondônia had an industrial GDP of R$ 8.2 billion in 2017, equivalent to 0.7% of the national industry. It employs 49,944 workers in the industry. The main industrial sectors are: Industrial Services of Public Utility, such as Electricity and Water (54.4%), Construction (19.2%), Food (17.6%), Wood (1.8%) and Non-metallic minerals (1.2%). These 5 sectors concentrate 94.2% of the state's industry.

Transport

Governador Jorge Teixeira de Oliveira International Airport is located in the state capital of Porto Velho.

References

External links

 Official Website

 
States of Brazil